Pavel Kroupa (born 24 September 1963 in Jindřichův Hradec, Czechoslovakia) is a Czech-Australian astrophysicist and professor at the University of Bonn.

Biography and career
After the 1968 failure of Prague spring, Kroupa's family fled from Czechoslovakia losing all possessions; as a consequence Kroupa grew up in Germany and South Africa. He acquired in 1983 his Abitur final exams in Göttingen and afterwards studied physics at The University of Western Australia in Perth. In 1988 he won the Isaac Newton scholarship at the University of Cambridge and in 1992 the senior Rouse Ball research scholarship at Trinity College, Cambridge and attained a doctorate in England in 1992 with a dissertation on the distribution of low mass stars in the Milky Way. Afterwards Kroupa worked until 2000 in astronomical research groups at Heidelberg University and at the Max Planck Institute for Astronomy, before he went to the University of Kiel and earned his Habilitation there. He was awarded a Heisenberg Fellowship in 2002. In April 2004 he was appointed to the observatory of the University of Bonn, which is today a department of the Argelander Institute for Astronomy. He was honoured in 2007 by a Swinburne University Visiting Professorship in Melbourne and by a Leverhulme Trust Visiting Professorship at the University of Sheffield.

Kroupa leads the research group on stellar populations and stellar dynamics at the University of Bonn. His research work began in 1987 in Australia with an investigation of Proxima Centauri. Kroupa is well known for his work for the distribution of stellar masses. In Cambridge in 1990–1992 by means of observational data on star counts and on binary stars and with detailed computations of stellar structure with Christopher A. Tout and Gerard F. Gilmore he deduced the contemporary, generally used canonical IMF (initial mass function), which describes the distribution of the star masses at their birth. In 2004 in Kiel together with Carsten Weidner he suggested the existence of a physical maximum star mass of approximately 150 solar masses. In Heidelberg he presented the first stellar-dynamic computations in 1993–1995 of star clusters, in which all stars are born as binary stars. He thus solved the problem that field populations have a significantly lower double star rate than star formation areas, because the binary stars are broken up as the star clusters evolve and disperse. He mathematically formulated and applied a theory of the evolution of binary stars (eigenevolution), created the method of dynamic population synthesis, and predicted the existence of binary stars forbidden by previous theory (forbidden binaries). He suggested in co-operation with Ingo Thies and Christian Theis in 2003–2004 in Kiel that brown dwarves and extrasolar planetary systems can develop in circumstellar disks due to passing stars which disturb the disks. Our Solar System is likely to have been shaped by such events.

In Kiel he also theoretically formulated the concept that galaxies ought to be described by stars forming in populations of embedded star clusters. With this he explained in 2002 the observed heating or thickening with age of the disk of the Milky Way, and with Carsten Weidner he formulated the "IGIMF (integrated galactic initial mass function) theory". In 2008 in Bonn together with Jan Pflamm-Altenburg he pointed out that the IGIMF theory implies that disk galaxies have a radial star formation law, in which the star formation density is proportional to the radial gas density. The IGIMF theory also implies that the star formation rates of irregular dwarf galaxies are proportional to their gas masses and must be corrected to clearly higher values as compared to previous theory. Simple star-formation laws for galaxies emerge from this work. The IGIMF theory gives good predictions for the mass distributions of the various metals within galaxies.

In 1997 and in Heidelberg Kroupa, together with Ulrich Bastian, took the first precise measurement of the spatial movement of two extragalactic systems. In 1997 he also discovered stellar-dynamic solutions for the satellite galaxies of the Milky Way without the need for exotic dark matter. His work implies a possible connection of the satellite galaxies with the Bulge of the Milky Way. This connection can be explained by a collision of the early Milky Way with another young galaxy during which the satellite galaxies formed as tidal dwarf galaxies about 11 Gyr ago. This is shown in a series of research papers with Manuel Metz and Marcel Pawlowski.

As a result of this work and since 2010 Kroupa has concerned himself increasingly with cosmology. While the cosmological standard model does not offer a unique solution to the cosmic background radiation and to cosmological expansion, he claims that the observed structures on scales of about 1kpc and above falsify the standard model. The implication of his work is that effective gravity must be non-Newtonian in the ultra-weak field limit.

Works
 The distribution of low-mass stars in the disc of the galaxy. University of Cambridge, 1992 (PhD thesis)
 Binary systems, star clusters and the galactic-field population: applied stellar dynamics. Kiel, 2002 (Habilitation thesis)
 The initial mass function of stars: evidence for uniformity in variable systems. Volume 295, Issue 5552 of Science Weekly, American Association for the Advancement of Science, 2002

Journal articles
 P. Kroupa, R.R. Burman, D.G. Blair, "Photometric observations of flares on Proxima Centauri",PASA 8, 119 (1989).
 P. Kroupa, C. A. Tout, G. Gilmore, "The distribution of low-mass stars in the Galactic disc",MNRAS 262, 545 (1993).
 P. Kroupa, "The Initial Mass Function of Stars: Evidence for Uniformity in Variable Systems",Science 295, 82 (2002).
 C. Weidner, P. Kroupa, "Evidence for a fundamental stellar upper mass limit from clustered star formation",MNRAS 348, 187 (2004).
 P. Kroupa, "Inverse dynamical population synthesis and star formation", MNRAS 277, 1491 (1995).
 P. Kroupa, "The dynamical properties of stellar systems in the Galactic disc", MNRAS 277, 1507 (1995).
 I. Thies, P. Kroupa, C. Theis, "Induced planet formation in stellar clusters: a parameter study of star-disc encounters", MNRAS 364, 961 (2005).
 I. Thies, P. Kroupa, S.P. Goodwin et al., "Tidally Induced Brown Dwarf and Planet Formation in Circumstellar Disks", ApJ 717, 577 (2010).
 P. Kroupa, "Thickening of galactic discs through clustered star formation", MNRAS 330, 707 (2002).
 C. Weidner, P. Kroupa, "The Variation of Integrated Star Initial Mass Functions among Galaxies",ApJ 625, 754 (2005).
 J. Pflamm-Altenburg, P.Kroupa, "Clustered star formation as a natural explanation for the Hα cut-off in disk galaxies", Nature 455, 641 (2008).
 J. Pflamm-Altenburg, P.Kroupa, "The Fundamental Gas Depletion and Stellar-Mass Buildup Times of Star-Forming Galaxies", ApJ 706, 516 (2009).
 J. Köppen, C. Weidner, P. Kroupa, "A possible origin of the mass-metallicity relation of galaxies",  MNRAS 375, 673 (2007).
 S. Recchi, F. Calura, P. Kroupa, "The chemical evolution of galaxies within the IGIMF theory: the [ α/Fe] ratios and downsizing", A&A 499, 711 (2009).
 P. Kroupa, U. Bastian, "The HIPPARCOS proper motion of the Magellanic Clouds", NewA 2, 77 (1997).
 P. Kroupa, "Dwarf spheroidal satellite galaxies without dark matter",  NewA 2,139 (1997).
 P. Kroupa, B. Famaey, K.S. de Boer, J. Dabringhausen, M. Pawlowski, C.M. Boily, H. Jerjen, D. Forbes, G. Hensler, M. Metz, "Local-Group tests of dark-matter concordance cosmology . Towards a new paradigm for structure formation", A&A 523, 32 (2010).
 P. Kroupa, "The Dark Matter Crisis: Falsification of the Current Standard Model of Cosmology", PASA 29, 395 (2012).
 P. Kroupa, M. Pawlowski, M. Milgrom, "The Failures of the Standard Model of Cosmology Require a New Paradigm", IJMPD 21, 1230003 (2012).
 P. Kroupa, "Lessons from the Local Group (and beyond) on dark matter", arXiv1409.6302 (2014).
 P. Kroupa, "Galaxies as simple dynamical systems: observational data disfavor dark matter and stochastic star formation", CaJPh 93, 169 (2015).

See also

External links

 Pavel Kroupa's webpage at the Argelander Institute for Astronomy
 Pavel Kroupa: Dark Matter, Cosmology and Progress website
 Pavel Kroupa, The Dark Matter Crisis, SciLogs website
 Dark Matter Debate between Simon White and Pavel Kroupa, YouTube, Nov. 18, 2010
 Pavel Kroupa – The vast polar structures around the Milky Way and Andromeda, YouTube, Nov. 18, 2013
 10 Problems with Dark Matter - Pavel Kroupa, YouTube, Apr. 10, 2021
 P. Kroupa @ Astrophysics Data System

21st-century Australian astronomers
Australian physicists
Czechoslovak emigrants to Australia
University of Western Australia alumni
1963 births
Living people
20th-century Australian astronomers